The 2023 SheBelieves Cup, named the 2023 SheBelieves Cup Presented by Visa for sponsorship reasons, was the eighth edition of the SheBelieves Cup, an invitational women's soccer tournament held in the United States. Featuring national teams from Brazil, Canada, Japan, and hosts United States, it began on February 16 and ended on February 22, 2023.

The United States emerged as champion, winning all three of its games.

Format
The four invited teams played in a round-robin tournament. Points awarded in the group stage followed the formula of three points for a win, one point for a draw, and zero points for a loss. In the event two teams were tied in points, tie-breakers would be applied in the order of goal difference, goals scored, head-to-head result, and a fair play score based on the number of yellow and red cards.

Venue

Squads

Teams

Standings

Results
All times are local. (The first two matches are UTC−5 and the remaining games are UTC−6.)

Goalscorers

References

External links
Official website

2023
SheBelieves Cup
2023 in American women's soccer
SheBelieves Cup